Wimberley High School is a public high school located in Wimberley, Texas (USA). It is part of the Wimberley Independent School District located in northwestern Hays County and classified as a 4A school by the UIL. In 2015, the school was rated "Met Standard" by the Texas Education Agency.

Academics
UIL Academic State Meet Champions - 
1993(2A)

Athletics
The Wimberley Texans compete in the following sports - 

Baseball
Basketball
Cross Country
Football
Golf
Soccer
Softball
Swimming
Tennis
Track and Field
Volleyball

State titles
Football - 
2005 (3A/D1), 2011 (3A/D2)
Volleyball - 
1999 (3A), 2001 (3A), 2002 (3A), 2003 (3A), 2006 (3A), 2007 (3A)
One Act Play-  
1993 (2A), 2001 (3A)

State finalist
Football, Volleyball
2019 (4A/D2)  2020 (4A)

References

External links
Wimberley ISD
Wimberley High School Subreddit

Schools in Hays County, Texas
Public high schools in Texas